Takilele Katoa (born 13 March 1991) is a New Zealand rugby league footballer who played for the St George Illawarra Dragons in the NRL Women's Premiership. 

Playing career
Born in Auckland, Katoa played her junior rugby league for the Griffith Waratah Tigers and Yenda All Stars.

In June 2019, she represented NSW Country at the Women's National Championships on the Gold Coast. On 14 June 2019, Katoa signed with the St George Illawarra Dragons NRL Women's Premiership team.

On 21 June 2019, she made her debut for New South Wales, coming off the bench in their 14–4 win over Queensland at North Sydney Oval.

In Round 1 of the 2019 NRL Women's season, Katoa made her debut for the Dragons in their 4–14 loss to the Brisbane Broncos. On 6 October 2019, she came off the bench in the Dragons' 6–30 Grand Final loss to the Broncos.

On 9 October 2019, Katoa was named the Country Rugby League women's Representative Player of the Year.

In 2020, she missed the 2020 NRL Women's season due to pregnancy.

References

External links
NRL profile

1991 births
Living people
New Zealand female rugby league players
Rugby league props
St. George Illawarra Dragons (NRLW) players